Fedara is a small village near Dholera in Ahmedabad district in Indian state of Gujarat.

Gujarat government has proposed a new International Airport for Ahmedabad city. The proposed international airport has been strategically located near the planned 335 million USD Port-cum-SEZ project of the Adani Group spread over 30,000 hectares at Dholera.

References
Federa, father of all airports
Federa airport gets wings with govt nod
Federa airport gets AAI nod
AAI team inspects site for greenfield airport in Ahmedabad
Fedara (Town in Ahmedabad District) airport gets Praful's nod
Ahoy! Ahmedabad
Dholera Port project put on a fast track
Rail connectivity planned for new international airport
New international airport got Gujarat government's nod

Villages in Ahmedabad district
Economy of Gujarat
Settlements in Gujarat